Squeak is a programming language. 

Squeak may also refer to:
Squeak!, a 2003 children's television series
Squeak, a fictional character from the Doctor Who episode "Survival"
Squeak, a fictional character from the comic strip Garfield
"Squeak", a song by Squarepusher (credited as Tom Jenkinson) from Bubble and Squeak

See also